Hijran Kamran qizi Huseynova (born August 13, 1955) is a professor and an Azerbaijani politician serving as the Chairwoman of the State Committee for Family, Women and Children Affairs of Azerbaijan Republic.

Early life
Hijran Huseynova was born in 1955 in the city of Baku. After completing her secondary education in 1972, Huseynova studied at the Department of History of Azerbaijan State University in Baku from 1972 to 1977. In 1977–1988, she worked as the History teacher at secondary school No. 189 in Baku. In 1985, she obtained a PhD in History and in 2001, PhD in Political Science. Since 1988, she has taught at Azerbaijan State University. From 2006 she is the professor and director of Department of Diplomacy and Modern Integration Processes of Azerbaijan State University.

Political career
Hijran Huseynova started her working career as a teacher in a public secondary school #189. During this time she was nominated and awarded the medal "Best Young Teacher of Azerbaijan Republic".
In 1978 she became the postgraduate student and at the same time started to teach at the Oriental Studies and History departments of Baku State University. In 1985 she got her PhD in political history and in 1992 she became an associate professor of the International Relations Department. She taught the following courses: History of International Relations, The process of the modern integration, Lobbying and Diaspora in the international relations. She was elected as a permanent member of the Scientific Council of the Baku State University. Since 1996 she had become a leading participant of the International Program TEMPUS TASCIS and gave lectures in France and Italy. She promoted the close collaboration between universities of Azerbaijan and France.
During 1998-1999 Hijran Huseynova participated at the Congress of Azerbaijan youth and Azerbaijan women.

In 1998 she published a monographic work "Azerbaijan in the system of European Integration» Since 1999 she had worked as a Head of the International Relations department at the State Committee for Women Problems. During the period of 2000-2006 she was the Dean of the International Law and International Relations department at  Baku State University.
In May–June 2000 Hijran Huseynova was involved in the regional program "Women- Leaders in Caucasus" coordinated by the "American Education Development"
In 2001 she participated at the international seminars and conferences organized by European Union and The Ministry of International Relations of Azerbaijan Republic.
In November 2001 Hijran Huseynova was awarded the academic degree of Doctor of Political Science and the theme of her dissertation was "Azerbaijan in the System of European Integration". It should be mentioned that she was the first woman in Azerbaijan who could get a degree of Doctor in the field of political sciences
In 2002 she was awarded a Diploma of the Ministry of Education for her valuable input in the sphere of education.

Since 2001 she has become an expert in gender programs of OSCE and Council of Europe. In February 2002 she participated as an expert of OSCE at the conference of the women leaders of the Baltic and South Caucuses. During the spring of 2002 as an expert of OSCE she conducted trainings in the sphere of the gender policy in the 15 regions of Azerbaijan.
In 2002 she was sent on behalf of Ministry of Foreign Affairs of Azerbaijan Republic to the headquarter NATO in Brussels.
In 2004 Hijran Huseynova was awarded with International Diploma of "Famous Scientists of XXI century".
In September 2007 the Supreme Attestation Commission attached to the President of the Republic of Azerbaijan awarded Hijran Huseynova the academic title of Professor at the department of diplomacy and Modern Integration.
Hijran Huseynova is closely cooperating with the Western-Eastern and Harvard Universities in the field of lobbyism and issues of International leadership.
She is a President of the "Association of the International Issues Researches" in Azerbaijan. She has published more than 100 scientific works in Azerbaijan and abroad.
In 2005 Huseynova was invited by The Royal Institute of International Affairs (Chatham House, London) and the Caucasus Policy Institute, King's College (London) to participate and give speech on the "Conflicts in the South Caucasus: Political, Security and Development Challenges".
Since February 6, 2006 Hijran Huseynova has been working as a Chairperson of the State Committee for Family, Women and Children Affairs of the Republic of Azerbaijan. From 2006 she is the professor and director of Department of Diplomacy and Modern Integration Processes of Azerbaijan.

She was elected as a member of Milli Majlis at the Parliamentary elections held on February 9, 2020 and dismissed her post of Chairperson of State Committee on Family, Woman and Children Affairs in early March 2020 according to the Decree of the President Aliyev. During the first meeting of the sixth convocation of Milli Majlis, she was elected the head of the Committee on Family, Women, and Children.

Works and awards
In September 2006 the Democratic Azerbaijan Public Center rewarded Huseynova the National Award "Gizil Buta" for the accomplishments in the sphere of defense of women rights and freedoms according to a survey conducted in Azerbaijan Republic.
In 2006 Huseynova received Ambassador of Peace Award.
In 2007 Huseynova got UNIFEM Certificate of Appreciation in recognition of the significant contribution she has made in promoting of gender equality and advancement of women.
In 2008 Hijran Huseynova was awarded Diploma for Peace and Friendship for strengthening friendship relations among nations and preserving cultural traditions by the International Forum of the Women "Pulse of the Planet".
In 2010 Hijran Huseynova was awarded The National Order of the Legion of Honour by the President of French Republic.
Due to her active participation in social and political life of the Republic of Azerbaijan Hijran Huseynova was awarded with Order "Shohrat" on August 12, 2015.

See also
Cabinet of Azerbaijan
Women in Azerbaijan

References 

1955 births
Living people
21st-century Azerbaijani women politicians
21st-century Azerbaijani politicians
Government ministers of Azerbaijan
Political office-holders in Azerbaijan
Academic staff of Baku State University
Azerbaijani professors
Azerbaijani women academics
Politicians from Baku
Baku State University alumni
Recipients of the Azerbaijan Democratic Republic 100th anniversary medal